The Hoogovens Wijk aan Zee Steel Chess Tournament 1998 was the 60th edition of the Hoogovens Wijk aan Zee Chess Tournament. It was held in Wijk aan Zee in January 1998 and was won jointly won by Vladimir Kramnik and Viswanathan Anand.

{| class="wikitable" style="text-align: center;"
|+ 60th Hoogovens tournament, group A, 16 January – 1 February 1998, Wijk aan Zee, Cat. XVII (2671)
! !! Player !! Rating !! 1 !! 2 !! 3 !! 4 !! 5 !! 6 !! 7 !! 8 !! 9 !! 10 !! 11 !! 12 !! 13 !! 14 !! Total !! TPR !! Place
|-
|-style="background:#ccffcc;"
| 1 || align=left| || 2790 ||  || ½ || 0 || ½ || 1 || ½ || 1 || 1 || 1 || ½ || ½ || 1 || 0 || 1 || 8½ || 2771 || 1–2
|-
|-style="background:#ccffcc;"
| 2 || align="left" | || 2770 || ½ ||  || ½ || ½ || ½ || ½ || 0 || ½ || ½ || 1 || 1 || 1 || 1 || 1 || 8½ || 2773 || 1–2
|-
| 3 || align="left" | || 2710 || 1 || ½ ||  || 1 || 1 || ½ || 0 || ½ || 1 || ½ || 0 || ½ || ½ || ½ || 7½ || 2724 || 3–5
|-
| 4 || align="left" | || 2635 || ½ || ½ || 0 ||  || 1 || ½ || ½ || ½ || ½ || ½ || 1 || ½ || ½ || 1 || 7½ || 2730 || 3–5
|-
| 5 || align="left" | || 2670 || 0 || ½ || 0 || 0 ||  || ½ || ½ || ½ || ½ || 1 || 1 || 1 || 1 || 1 || 7½ || 2727 || 3–5
|-
| 6 || align="left" | || 2735 || ½ || ½ || ½ || ½ || ½ ||  || 1 || ½ || ½ || 0 || 0 || ½ || ½ || 1 || 6½ || 2665 || 6–10
|-
| 7 || align="left" | || 2670 || 0 || 1 || 1 || ½ || ½ || 0 ||  || 0 || ½ || ½ || ½ || ½ || ½ || 1 || 6½ || 2670 || 6–10
|-
| 8 || align="left" | || 2675 || 0 || ½ || ½ || ½ || ½ || ½ || 1 ||  || ½ || ½ || 0 || 1 || ½ || ½ || 6½ || 2670 || 6–10
|-
| 9 || align="left" | || 2575 || 0 || ½ || 0 || ½ || ½ || ½ || ½ || ½ ||  || 1 || ½ || 0 || 1 || 1 || 6½ || 2678 || 6–10
|-
| 10 || align="left" | || 2740 || ½ || 0 || ½ || ½ || 0 || 1 || ½ || ½ || 0 ||  || 1 || ½ || 1 || ½ || 6½ || 2665 || 6–10
|-
| 11 || align="left" | || 2680 || ½ || 0 || 1 || 0 || 0 || 1 || ½ || 1 || ½ || 0 ||  || ½ || ½ || 0 || 5½ || 2613 || 11
|- 
| 12 || align="left" | || 2580 || 0 || 0 || ½ || ½ || 0 || ½ || ½ || 0 || 1 || ½ || ½ ||  || ½ || ½ || 5 || 2590 || 12
|-
| 13 || align="left" | || 2605 || 1 || 0 || ½ || ½ || 0 || ½ || ½ || ½ || 0 || 0 || ½ || ½ ||  || 0 || 4½ || 2565 || 13
|-
| 14 || align="left" | || 2555 || 0 || 0 || ½ || 0 || 0 || 0 || 0 || ½ || 0 || ½ || 1 || ½ || 1 ||  || 4 || 2538 || 14
|}

{| class="wikitable" style="text-align: center;"
|+ 60th Hoogovens tournament, group B, 20–31 January 1998, Wijk aan Zee, Netherlands, Category XI (2501)
! !! Player !! Rating !! 1 !! 2 !! 3 !! 4 !! 5 !! 6 !! 7 !! 8 !! 9 !! 10 !! 11 !! 12 !! Total !! TPR !! Place
|-
| 1 || align=left| || 2480 ||  || 1 || 1 || 1 || 1 || 1 || 1 || ½ || 1 || ½ || ½ || ½ || 9 || 2764 || 1–2
|-
| 2 || align="left" | || 2565 || 0 ||  || ½ || 1 || ½ || 1 || 1 || 1 || 1 || 1 || 1 || 1 || 9 || 2757 || 1–2
|-
| 3 || align="left" | || 2535 || 0 || ½ ||  || 0 || ½ || ½ || 1 || ½ || 0 || 1 || 1 || 1 || 6 || 2533 || 3–5
|-
| 4 || align="left" | || 2500 || 0 || 0 || 1 ||  || ½ || ½ || 0 || 1 || 1 || ½ || 1 || ½ || 6 || 2536 || 3–5
|-
| 5 || align="left" | || 2525 || 0 || ½ || ½ || ½ ||  || ½ || 0 || ½ || ½ || 1 || 1 || 1 || 6 || 2534 || 3–5
|-
| 6 || align="left" | || 2485 || 0 || 0 || ½ || ½ || ½ ||  || ½ || 1 || ½ || 1 || 1 || 0 || 5½ || 2502 || 6–7
|-
| 7 || align="left" | || 2485 || 0 || 0 || 0 || 1 || 1 || ½ ||  || ½ || ½ || 0 || 1 || 1 || 5½ || 2502 || 6–7
|-
| 8 || align="left" | || 2615 || ½ || 0 || ½ || 0 || ½ || 0 || ½ ||  || 1 || 0 || 1 || 1 || 5 || 2454 || 8
|-
| 9 || align="left" | || 2460 || 0 || 0 || 1 || 0 || ½ || ½ || ½ || 0 ||  || 1 || 0 || 1 || 4½ || 2439 || 9
|-
| 10 || align="left" | || 2445 || ½ || 0 || 0 || ½ || 0 || 0 || 1 || 1 || 0 ||  || ½ || ½ || 4 || 2403 || 10
|-
| 11 || align="left" | || 2450 || ½ || 0 || 0 || 0 || 0 || 0 || 0 || 0 || 1 || ½ ||  || 1 || 3 || 2330 || 11
|- 
| 12 || align="left" | || 2465 || ½ || 0 || 0 || ½ || 0 || 1 || 0 || 0 || 0 || ½ || 0 ||  || 2½ || 2293 || 12
|}

References

Tata Steel Chess Tournament
1998 in chess
1998 in Dutch sport